Crescent Baguma, also known as Amooti Crescent Baguma and Baguma Crescent Rusoke, (30 June 1960 – 17 December 2015) was a businessman in Uganda. He reportedly was one of the wealthiest individuals in that country in 2012.

Background and education
He was born to Acaali Simon Kalenzi and Akiiki Teresa Matama. He relocated to Ibanda Demonstration School, in Ibanda, Ibanda District for his Primary 5 to Primary 7. He then returned to Fort Portal for middle and high school at St. Leo's College, Kyegobe.

Investments and businesses
In 2000, Baguma started a construction company with his wife which they named BCR General Limited (BCR). BCR has three divisions; (a) road construction (b) building construction and (c) manufacture of building tiles. The company has in the past worked for the Uganda National Roads Authority, the Uganda Ministry of Defence and MTN Uganda.

Personal life
Baguma met Dorothy Mwirumubi in 1983 and they got married in 1989. Together, they had six children; Eileen, Emmanuella, Isingoma, Kato, Sylvia, and Ronald. On the night of 17 December 2015, the vehicle he was traveling in was involved in an accident. His vehicle veered off the road and crashed at Kyegegwa. He died instantly.

See also
 List of wealthiest people in Uganda

References

External links
Photos: Tycoon Crescent Baguma Dies in Road Accident

1960 births
2015 deaths
People from Kabarole District
People from Western Region, Uganda
Ugandan businesspeople
People educated at St. Leo's College, Kyegobe